Megan Olivi is an American mixed martial arts news/events reporter who hosts UFC Ultimate Insider on Fox Sports 1.

Early life
Megan Olivi is the youngest of three children and was born in New Jersey. She spent the majority of her youth growing up in Nazareth, Pennsylvania. She is of Italian descent.

Olivi played softball in school and wanted to pursue a career in gymnastics but was not able to due to her family's financial situation.

College years
Olivi attended Seton Hall University where she earned a degree in political science as her undergraduate major. While attending Seton Hall, she interned with Fox News. Olivi then earned a master's degree in broadcast journalism at Fordham University.

Journalism career
Shortly after completing her master's degree, Olivi was offered an opportunity to cover the sport of Mixed Martial Arts in Las Vegas, Nevada and decided to move across country and take a chance on this career opportunity. After taking this new job, Olivi fell in love with the sport of Mixed Martial Arts while also continuing to polish her on-camera skills, most notably co-hosting the live Ultimate Fighting Championship (UFC) Preshow Fight Day. Olivi then went on to work for Fox Sports covering UFC events and hosting lifestyle segments for FoxSports.com. In February 2013, Olivi accepted a role as a correspondent for Fox 6 News San Diego covering the San Diego Padres as a Social Media Reporter while also hosting and producing a weekly magazine show called “Padres POV”. Olivi soon moved on from her career with the Padres and returned to Las Vegas to pursue a reporting opportunity with the UFC where she currently travels the world covering UFC events. Olivi also hosts UFC Ultimate Insider on Fox Sports 1. She also has a series on UFC Fight Pass, The Exchange With Megan Olivi.

While on NFL on FOX, Olivi would be serving as a sideline reporter on the network's NFL coverage in the 2021 season. She teamed with color analyst announcers Aqib Talib or LaVar Arrington and play-by-play announcers Gus Johnson, Joe Davis,  Brandon Gaudin or Jason Benetti.

2017 Miss Universe pageant
Olivi was both a preliminary and final telecast judge at the 2017 Miss Universe pageant.

Personal life
Olivi is married to former UFC flyweight title challenger Joseph Benavidez.

References

Living people
American television reporters and correspondents
People from New Jersey
American people of Italian descent
Seton Hall University alumni
Fordham University alumni
Mixed martial arts journalists
1986 births